Harpreet Singh may refer to:

Harpreet Singh (sport shooter), Indian sport shooter
Harpreet Singh (boxer) (born 1979), Indian boxer
Harpreet Singh (carrom player), state carrom champion of Punjab, India
Harpreet Singh (field hockey) (born 1973), Indian hockey player
Harpreet Singh (footballer, born 1982), Indian football player
Harpreet Singh (footballer, born 2002), Indian football player
Harpreet Singh (cricketer, born 1967), Indian cricketer

See also 
Harpreet Singh Bhatia (born 1991), Indian cricketer
Harpreet Singh Giani, Indian advocate and barrister
Giani Harpreet Singh (born 1972), jathedar of the Akal Takht